Jack and Eliza (also called Jack + Eliza) is an alternative rock band formed in New York City in 2012, consisting of childhood friends Eliza Callahan and Jack Staffen. Callahan and Staffen both started playing music when they were young, but began songwriting together in high school. Their music has been compared to the sunshine pop and surf music of the 60s and 70s and self-described as "naked pop.” In 2017, the duo formed a new musical group, Purr.

Discography

Albums 

 Gentle Warnings (2015)

EPs 

 No Wonders (2014)

Singles 

 Secrets (2014)

References

Indie pop groups from New York (state)